The following is a list of Malayalam films released in the year 1994.

kabooliwala

Dubbed films

References

 1994
1994
Lists of 1994 films by country or language
1994 in Indian cinema